Les larmes du couteau in Czech Slzy nože ('tears of the knife') is a 1928 opera by Bohuslav Martinů.

Recordings
1999 - Martinu: Slzy nože - sung in Czech - Les larmes du couteau; with The Voice of the Forest 1CD Hana Jonášová, Lenka Smídová, Roman Janál, Helena Kaupová, Jaroslav Brezina, Vladimír Okénko; Chamber Choir, Prague Philharmonia Jirí Belohlávek Supraphon
2022 - Martinů: Larmes de couteau ; with Comedy on the Bridge. Esther Dierkes, Elena Tsallagova, Björn Bürger, Adam Palka, Maria Riccarda Wesseling, Stine Marie Fischer, Andrew Bogard, Michael Smallwood, Saatsorchester Stuttgart, Cornelius Meister Capriccio 1CD 2022

References

Operas
1928 operas
Operas by Bohuslav Martinů